The ISU-152 (meaning "IS tank based self-propelled installation with 152mm caliber gun") is a Soviet self-propelled gun developed and used during World War II. It was unofficially nicknamed Zveroboy ("beast killer") in response to several large German tanks and guns coming into service, including Tigers and Panthers. Since the ISU-152's gun was mounted in a casemate, aiming it was awkward, and had to be done by repositioning the entire vehicle using the tracks. Therefore, it was used as mobile artillery to support more mobile infantry and armor attacks. It continued service into the 1970s and was used in several campaigns and countries.

History

The beginnings of the ISU-152 came on 24 January 1943, when the first prototype of the SU-152 was unveiled. This was a fully enclosed 152mm gun-howitzer on the KV-1S tank chassis. It was designated  ("Project 236") . Project 236 was completed in Factory No. 100 in Chelyabinsk, and was tested successfully from 24 January to 7 February 1943. On 14 February the vehicle was adopted and put into production under the KV-14 (кв-14) designation; in April 1943 the designation was changed to SU-152" (СУ-152).

Although the SU-152 was successful in combat, production of the KV-1S tank chassis was ending, which made the modernisation of the vehicle necessary, using the new IS tank chassis. On 25 May 1943 the administration of Factory No. 100 ordered the modernisation of the SU-152, which included increased armour protection and other improvements. Development began in July 1943, under the supervision of Josef Kotin, the chief designer of Soviet heavy tanks, and G. N. Moskvin as the main designer.

The new design, designated IS-152 (ИС-152), was tested from September to November 1943. Testing revealed a large number of deficiencies, which sent it back for further improvement. On 6 November 1943 an order was issued for adoption of the improved variant, under the ISU-152 designation, and in December production began at the Chelyabinsk Kirovsk Plant, replacing the SU-152.

Design

On 15 April 1942, at the plenum of the artillery committee, where the development of assault guns for support of the infantry was discussed, the necessity of also developing assault guns capable of destroying fortified positions was acknowledged. It was intended these assault guns would be armed with a 152.4 mm gun-howitzer and used for penetration of the enemy defence in the offensive operations planned for 1942–1943. This resulted in the development of the Object 236, and eventually the SU-152, which concept was later continued and further developed with the ISU-152.

The ISU-152 followed the same design as most other Soviet self-propelled guns. The fully armoured hull was divided into two compartments: fighting compartment for the crew, gun and ammunition in the front of the hull, and engine and transmission in the rear. The gun was mounted slightly to the right of centre with a limited traverse of 12 degrees left and right. The crew consisted of four or five men placed in the superstructure. Three of the crew were to the left of the gun: driver to the front, then gunner and last the loader. The vehicle commander and lockman (who operated the gun breech) were to the right: commander to the front and the lockman behind. When the crew consisted of four men, the loading was carried out by the lockman.

The suspension consisted of twelve torsion bars for the six road wheels on either side. The drive sprockets were at the back, and the front idlers were identical to the road wheels. Each track was made up of 90 links. There were three internal fuel tanks, two in the crew area and one in the engine compartment. These were usually supplemented with four unconnected external fuel tanks. 12- and 24-volt electrical power supplies came from a 1 kW generator feeding four accumulator batteries.

For observation from the interior, all roof hatches had periscopes and there were two gun sights: telescopic ST-10 (СТ-10) and panoramic. For crew communication a TPU-4-BisF intercom was fitted, and for inter-vehicle communication there was a single 10R or 10RK radio. These were better than Soviet equipment at the start of the war but still inferior to German equivalents.

The crew were given two PPSh submachine guns with 1491 rounds and 20 F-1 grenades for short-range self-defence.

The ISU-152 was armed with the same gun as the SU-152, but it used the hull of the IS-1 tank instead of the KV-1S. Later in the war the ISU-152 was further improved. It used the hull of the IS-2 or IS-2 model 1944 tank, the armour of the mantlet was increased, the gun was replaced by newer variants, a 12.7×108 mm DShK anti-aircraft machine gun was installed by the right forward hatch and later its ammunition capacity increased, the 10R radio set was upgraded to a 10RK and the fuel capacity was increased.

Some ISU-152s were equipped with even larger external fuel tanks, two tanks on the rear hull deck, in addition to the four external fuel tanks —  each, maximum — or with two smaller additional external fuel tanks, on the hull rear. This option was probably available for the post-war ISU-152 variants.

Between December 1943 and May 1945, 1,885 ISU-152s were built. Mass production ceased in 1947, with 3,242 vehicles produced in total.

Post-war ISU-152 modernisation included installation of night vision sights, replacing of the V-2IS engine with the V-54K, the 12.7mm machine gun was replaced by a newer variant, the ammunition capacity increased to 30 rounds, additional armor, automotive improvements and significant increase of the main fuel capacity.

Variants
The initial variant was developed in 1943. The factory designation was Object 241 (Объект 241). It was armed with the 152.4 mm ML-20S (МЛ-20С) model 1937 gun-howitzer, with a barrel length of over 4.2 metres (27.9 calibers). The rate of fire was 2-3 rounds/min. The ISU-152 carried 21 rounds of two piece (shell and charge) armor-piercing and high explosive ammunition.

The ISU-152 had different versions, with changes in the gun (later versions), the number of hatches, or the hull (based on the hull of the IS-1, IS-2 or IS-2 model 1944 tanks). The IS-2 based versions had a thicker gun shield and larger fuel tank. Until May 1944, the main armament was the 152.4 mm ML-20 model 1937 gun-howitzer. The ISU-152 had a rate of fire of 2-3 rounds/min. The early versions had three hatches in the superstructure roof and one emergency hatch at the bottom of the hull behind the driver's seat, which had an armored cover. Later versions had a fourth, round hatch in the superstructure roof on the right, next to the rectangular hatch on the left.

ISU-152-2
ISU-152BM (ИСУ-152БМ), sometimes referred to as ISU-152BM-1 or ISU-152-1, with the factory designation Object 246 (Объект 246), was a single prototype developed in April 1944 in Factory No. 100 in attempt to increase the firepower of the ISU-152. The "BM" ("БМ") in the designation stands for "High-Powered" ("Большой Мощности"). The main purpose of the ISU-152BM was to fight against heavily armored tank destroyers such as the Elefant and the Jagdtiger. It was armed with the 152.4 mm BL-8 (БЛ-8) long-barreled gun, which unlike the ISU-152's gun was not a gun-howitzer. However, during trials in July 1944, the gun showed some deficiencies, such as being difficult for the crew to operate, unreliability of the muzzle brake and the breech block, and unsatisfactory performance of the shells. In addition, the gun, protruding far forward of the hull front, limited the maneuverability of the vehicle. The self-propelled gun carried 21 rounds of two-piece (shell and charge) ammunition, and had a rate of fire of 2 rounds per minute. It used the engine, transmission, running gear, and electric equipment of the ISU-122. In August 1944 the BL-8 gun was replaced with the improved 152.4 mm BL-10 (БЛ-10) long-barreled gun, with a slightly shorter barrel of  (48.5 calibers). This vehicle gun was designated ISU-152-2 (ИСУ-152-2). The factory designation was Object 247 (Объект 247). It was also equipped with external fuel tanks. The gun had a modified muzzle brake and a semi-automatic breech block. It had a rate of fire of 3 rounds/min. In December 1944 the ISU-152-2 underwent trials, revealing the barrel strength and the angle of horizontal guidance were unsatisfactory. The gun was sent for further improvement, but it was not completed before the war ended. The vehicle was never adopted. After the war, the final and most improved, third modification of ISU-152-2 was completed.

Object 704

Object 704   (Объект 704) was the factory designation for a prototype self propelled gun developed in 1945. Also known as the Kirovets-2, it was developed on the chassis of the Kirovets-1, the initial prototype of the project that became the IS-3. The self-propelled gun carried 20 rounds of two-piece (shell and charge) armour-piercing and high-explosive ammunition. The rate of fire was 1-2 round/min. Object 704 had four hatches at the superstructure roof and one emergency hatch at the bottom of the hull behind the driver's seat, which had an armoured cover. The self-propelled gun carried two external  fuel tanks, not connected to the supply system. The secondary armament of the fighting vehicle consisted of two 12.7×108 mm DShK machine guns, one anti-aircraft and one co-axial. The protection was increased by placing thicker armour at more radical angles. Object 704 was the best protected of all experimental or production Soviet self-propelled guns of the Second World War. However, the radical incline of the superstructure walls combined with the increased recoil of the gun, due to the lack of a muzzle brake, significantly complicated the work of the crew, and for this reason it was not adopted.

ISU-152K

Object 241K (Объект 241К)  was the factory designation  for a  modernised variant of the wartime ISU-152, developed in 1956. It used a new engine, that of the T-54, with a cooling system and a heater. The ammunition capacity was increased to 30 rounds after the removal of an additional internal fuel tank placed in the crew compartment. It received a new commander's cupola, and also new sights. The running gear used many elements of the T-10. The mantlet had additional armor ring protecting the sight. Some of the ISU-152Ks received an additional 15 mm armour plate welded on top of the 60 mm armour plate covering the mantlet above. Also, some of them received an additional armour plate welded on the upper mantlet front. The modernisation was carried out in the Leningrad Kirov Plant.

ISU-152M
ISU-152M was the final variant of ISU-152, developed in 1959. The work was now transferred to the Chelyabinsk Kirovsk Plant. This modernisation was parallel to the IS-2M program and the ISU-152M used many elements of the tank. The factory designation was Object 241M (Объект 241М). The innovations included night vision sights, increased ammunition stowage for the 12.7 mm machine gun, which was replaced by the improved DShKM, and internal automotive improvements. It had the same new commander's cupola and sights as the ISU-152K. It also had the same main internal fuel tank capacity, adding  more to the vehicle′s range on a road compared to the ISU-152, and an increased ammunition capacity to 30 rounds due to the removal of an internal fuel tank. The ring protecting the sight was present, and the armour of the upper mantlet front was further increased with a thicker additional armour plate. The ISU-152M had the same V-54K engine with a heater, but lacked the cooling system.

Use

The ISU-152 self-propelled gun combined three battle roles: heavy assault gun, heavy tank destroyer and heavy self-propelled artillery. The 152.4 mm gun used a number of powerful (shell and charge) ammunition. Some of these ammunition had a 43.56 kg high-explosive shell, or a 48.78 kg armour-piercing shell, or the heaviest of all, the 53-G-545 (53-Г-545) long-range concrete-piercing ammunition with a 56 kg shell. The ISU-152 was used for infantry and tank support in attacking fortified enemy positions in a direct-fire role, for artillery support on the battlefield in an indirect-fire role and for engagement against armored vehicles in a direct-fire role.

Heavy assault gun
As a heavy assault gun, the ISU-152 was an extremely valuable weapon in urban combat operations such as the Battle of Berlin, Budapest and Königsberg. The vehicle's excellent armour protection finally provided the 152.4 mm gun with good protection from most German anti-tank guns, allowing it to advance into the face of direct anti-tank fire, while the huge, low velocity, high-explosive rounds were excellent at blasting open even the most heavily fortified and reinforced enemy strongpoints. Such actions would be much more dangerous and much less effective for a conventional towed artillery piece, with their high crew exposure and low mobility, or even a tank, with their smaller main guns. When supporting tanks, the usual tactics of the ISU-152 were to be used in the second line of the attack order,  behind the attacking tanks, which were usually IS tanks with equal mobility.

The ISU-152, like the earlier SU-152 and contemporary ISU-122, was employed by Independent Heavy Self-propelled Artillery Regiments. Between May 1943 and 1945, 53 of these regiments were formed. Many of them were re-formed tank regiments, and employed similar direct fire tactics as used by tanks when supporting infantry. Each of the heavy regiment had 21 guns, divided into four artillery batteries of five vehicles and the commander's vehicle. For support, these heavy regiments had some supplementary unarmoured vehicles such as trucks, jeeps, or motorcycles. In December 1944, Guards Heavy Self-propelled Artillery Brigades were formed, to provide heavy fire support to the tank armies. They were organized along the model of tank brigades, each with 65 ISU-152 or ISU-122 self-propelled guns.

To minimize the risks of being knocked out by Panzerfaust-equipped units during urban operations, the ISU-152 usually acted in one- or two-vehicle detachments alongside infantry squads for protection. The infantry squad would include a specialist sniper (or at least a sharpshooter), some submachine gunners and sometimes a flamethrower. The ISU-152's heavy-calibre DShK machine gun was also useful for targeting Panzerfaust gunners hiding on upper floors of city buildings or behind protective cover and defensive barricades. Effective teamwork between the ISU-152 crew and supporting infantry allowed them to achieve their goals with minimal losses, but if such tactics were not adhered to, the attacking vehicles were easily attacked and destroyed, usually through the weaker armor on the roof or rear compartment.

Heavy tank destroyer

The ISU-152 could also operate as an effective heavy tank destroyer. Though it was not designed for the role, the vehicle inherited the nickname Zveroboy ("beast killer") from its predecessor, the SU-152, for its ability to reliably kill the best protected German fighting vehicles; the Panther tank, the Tiger I and Tiger II tanks, and even the rare Elefant and Jagdtiger tank destroyers. The sheer weight of the 152.4 mm shells resulted in an extremely low rate of fire, only one to three rounds per minute, and were not as accurate at long range as high-velocity tank and anti-tank guns. However, the massive blast effect from the heavy high-explosive warhead was capable of blowing the turret completely off a Tiger tank. A direct hit usually destroyed or damaged the target's tracks and suspension, immobilizing it. While the low-velocity 152mm shell did not generally penetrate heavy armor, it frequently killed or severely wounded the crew through spalling (splintering) inside the hull as well as injuries caused by blast concussion. Due to the brittle nature of German tank steel during the latter stages of the war, it was common for impacted armor plates to shatter from the concussive blast, or for weld lines to break, allowing the entire armor piece to fall away. Surviving crew were often left with an immobilized vehicle which had to be hurriedly abandoned before being destroyed. 

For anti-tank operations following the July 1943 Battle of Kursk, armour-piercing ammunition was developed, with an eye towards giving the howitzer a more traditional anti-tank capability. However, these rounds were expensive, in short supply, and only moderately more effective than the standard non-penetrating high-explosive round. As a howitzer the ML-20S exchanged velocity and accuracy for throw weight and distance, and was not intended to compete with true anti-tank guns. Sometimes the concrete-piercing ammunition was used for the anti-tank role. A primitive shaped charge ammunition, with a  shell, was also developed. It had a maximum penetration of 250 mm of RHA at 90°, but it was not used during the war.

The ISU-152's 90 mm of sloped frontal armor, in contrast to the SU-152's 65 mm, provided excellent frontal protection from the 75mm KwK 40 gun of the ubiquitous Panzer IV and StuG family at all but the closest ranges, while also forcing the original Tiger I, with its vaunted 88 mm KwK 36 gun, to close to medium ranges in order to successfully penetrate the vehicle, negating its traditional long-range superiority and putting it within effective range of the Soviet T-34-85 medium tanks

The ISU-152 was not a true purpose-built tank destroyer. It had a very low rate of fire compared with specialised tank destroyers such as the German Jagdpanther or the Soviet SU-100, which could manage a brief burst of five to eight rounds per minute. However, prior to the introduction of the SU-100 it was the only Soviet armored vehicle capable of tackling the German heavy tanks with any kind of reliability, and its ability to satisfy multiple roles meant it was produced in far greater numbers than the SU-100. Attention to camouflage, quick relocation between firing positions, and massed ambushes of four or five vehicles firing in salvo at a single target's flanks reduced the disadvantage of the low rate of fire.

Self-propelled artillery
The ISU-152 was also sometimes used as self-propelled artillery for support on the battlefield and preparatory bombardments, though it had a medium range of fire and a slow speed of reloading. The Soviet army had not developed specialized vehicles for this purpose. Their tank and mechanized units were well equipped with towed artillery, but the towed guns were very vulnerable while moving and they could not support tanks and motorized infantry during rapid advances into enemy positions, especially when they lacked the armored fully enclosed design of vehicles like ISU-152.

The internal stowage was limited to only 20 or 21 rounds of ammunition, with extra rounds often stowed on the rear deck. A second, panoramic, sight was used for direct fire up to  range no direct fire. However, it was problematic for the gunner to switch between the two. To compensate it was simpler to concentrate the fire of several vehicles onto the target, sacrificing accuracy for volume of firepower. The high-explosive shells were large enough to take out even a heavily armoured vehicle, or a fortification with the even heavier long-range concrete-piercing shells. The usual complement of ammunition was 13 high-explosive and 7 armour-piercing or concrete-piercing.

The armor penetration can vary between ammunition batches and different rolled homogeneous armour.

Soviet military service
World War II
Eastern Front
Continuation War
Soviet–Japanese War
Manchurian Invasion
Hungarian Revolution

Foreign military service

Finland
In June 1944, during the Continuation War, a captured ISU-152 was used by the Finnish military. It was abandoned during the counter-attack at Kärstilänjärvi after receiving numerous shots from Soviet T-34-85 medium tanks. This was a direct result of the Finnish crew's lack of experience and training with the ISU-152. Another captured one was repaired in Varkaus, Finland, but never saw combat.

Poland

In 1944, more than 30 ISU-152s were delivered to the People's Army of Poland. Shortly afterwards, the Polish military created the 25th Polish Self-Propelled Artillery Regiment, which consisted of 10 ISU-152s and 22 ISU-122s. As part of the 1st Polish Tank Corps (which operated both T-34-76 and T-34-85 tanks), the regiment took part in combat action along the River Nysa, located in southwestern Poland in March 1945. In the early months of 1945, the Polish command began to form another ISU-152 regiment, but with too few vehicles, the newly-formed 13th Polish self-propelled artillery regiment received two ISU-152s and two batteries comprising SU-85s. This regiment took part in the Battle of Berlin between April and May of 1945.

Post-WWII, ISU-152s remained in service with the Polish military until the early 1960s.

Czechoslovakia
As part of the Soviet Union's military assistance to friendly or pro-Soviet countries around the world, a few ISU-152s were transferred to the Czechoslovakian military after World War II, which operated them until the end of 1950s. For several decades it was the heaviest armored vehicle in the Czechoslovak People's Army, which used these to test newly-developed anti-tank obstacles.

Romania
One captured during World War II. The Romanian Army had received 20 ISU-152s during the 1950s; these were assigned to the artillery units of the 6th, 7th and 57th tank divisions of the Romanian Army. They were known as T-152 in Romanian service.

Yugoslavia
The Yugoslav Army had only one ISU-152 in its inventory. This sole vehicle was abandoned by units of the Soviet Red Army's 2nd Ukrainian Front in 1944. In 1946, members of the Yugoslav 2nd Tank Brigade's first battalion, led by technical officer Stojimir Ilijevic – Guerrilla, recovered the self-propelled gun after five days of work. As a unique vehicle it was used by the Army's Tank School at Bela Crkva. After it was withdrawn from service, this single Yugoslav ISU-152 ended up as a practice target at the Manjača firing range.

China
In 1955, the Soviet Army moved out from Dalian in northeastern China, officially ending 10 years of military occupation. All weapons and armaments left behind by the Soviet Union were sold to the Chinese People's Liberation Army, including 67 ISU-152s; 45 were given to the newly-created 1st Mechanized Division of the PLA.

Democratic People's Republic of Korea
During and after the Korean War, ISU-152s were operated by the Korean People's Army of the DPRK. North Korea reportedly still uses ISU-152s in both active and reserve units, however, the actual number is unknown.

Egypt

In the early 1960s the Egyptian military received at least one regiment of ISU-152s. They were used during the Arab-Israeli conflicts between 1967 and 1973. They proved mostly ineffective and several were captured by the Israeli Defence Forces; one is now on display in Yad la-Shiryon.

Iraq

A few surviving examples were operational during the Iran–Iraq War and First Gulf War.

Survivors and memorials
The ISU-152 can be seen, exhibited or simply located, at different museums and memorials around the world. Some were used to create monuments.

Military Historical Museum of Artillery, Engineers and Signal Corps, Saint Petersburg, Russia
Central Museum of Armed Forces, Moscow, Russia
Military Historical Museum of Armored Fighting Vehicles and Equipment in Kubinka, Kubinka, Russia
Sapun Mountain Memorial, Sevastopol, Ukraine
National Museum of the History of Ukraine in the Second World War, Kyiv, Ukraine (two vehicles, one of which is crudely modified with spare D-25T gun and labeled as ISU-122)
Museum of the Polish Army, Warsaw, Poland
Armoured Warfare Museum, Poznań, Poland
Military Technical Museum, Lešany, Czech Republic
The Armored Corps Memorial Site and Museum at Latrun, Latrun, Israel
Stalin Line Museum, Minsk, Belarus
Belarusian State Museum of Great Patriotic War History, Minsk, Belarus
Parola Armor Museum, Parola, Finland
German-Russian Museum Berlin-Karlshorst, Karlshorst, Berlin, Germany
Victory Park Memorial, Saratov, Russia
Victory Park Memorial, Moscow, Russia
People's Tank Museum, Changping District, Beijing, People's Republic of China.
Imperial War Museum, Duxford, Cambridgeshire, England – Now sold to private collector.
Royal Museum of the Armed Forces and Military History, Brussels (Belgium) not present in Brussels anymore, most tanks have been moved to other museum sites in Belgium
Australian Armour and Artillery Museum, Cairns, Australia.

Notes

References

External links

 – Blog entry discussing the use of ISU-152s as improvised bulldozers following the Chernobyl disaster.

World War II tank destroyers
World War II assault guns
Assault guns of the Soviet Union
152 mm artillery
Military vehicles introduced from 1940 to 1944
World War II armoured fighting vehicles of the Soviet Union
Tracked self-propelled howitzers